The 1st Guldbagge Awards ceremony, presented by the Swedish Film Institute, honored the best Swedish 1963 and 1964, and took place on 25 September 1964. The Silence directed by Ingmar Bergman was presented with the award for Best Film.

Awards
 Best Film: The Silence by Ingmar Bergman
 Best Director: Ingmar Bergman for The Silence
 Best Actor: Keve Hjelm for Raven's End
 Best Actress: Ingrid Thulin for The Silence

References

External links
Official website
Guldbaggen on Facebook
Guldbaggen on Twitter
1st Guldbagge Awards at Internet Movie Database

1964 in Sweden
1964 film awards
Guldbagge Awards ceremonies
1960s in Stockholm
September 1964 events in Europe